Hammon is a town in the U.S. state of Oklahoma, the majority of which is in Roger Mills County, but some of which extends into Custer County. It is located at the junction of Oklahoma State Highways 33 and 34.

The town is named for Indian agent James H. Hammon, who was assigned to the Red Moon Agency near the future site of Hammon.  This was a subagency of the Cheyenne-Arapaho Agency at Darlington, north of Fort Reno, and his mission was to build a reservation school and to teach the Cheyenne and Arapaho to farm. His wife, Ida M. Hammon, was postmaster when a post office was established in their home on June 30, 1894.

The townsite was originally located in Custer County, but when the Wichita Falls and Northwestern Railroad (later known as the Missouri, Kansas and Texas Railway) laid track west of the town in 1910, the majority of the town was moved west into Roger Mills County to be near the railroad. On May 22, 1911, the board of county commissioners accepted the incorporation of the town.

The population was 568 at the 2010 census.

Geography
Hammon is located at  (35.632369, −99.381267). According to the United States Census Bureau, the town has a total area of 0.7 square miles (1.9 km2), all land.

Hammon is located southwest of the intersection of State Highway 33 and State Highway 34 in Southwestern Oklahoma, known for Oklahoma Tourism purposes as Great Plains Country.  The town is just west of the Washita National Wildlife Refuge, and just east of the Black Kettle National Grassland.

Climate

Demographics

As of the census of 2000, there were 469 people, 169 households, and 114 families residing in the town. There were 203 housing units at an average density of 275.7 per square mile (105.9/km2). The racial makeup of the town was 60.77% White, 0.64% African American, 34.54% Native American, 0.21% Asian, 1.71% from other races, and 2.13% from two or more races. Hispanic or Latino of any race were 5.76% of the population.

There were 169 households, out of which 33.7% had children under the age of 18 living with them, 47.3% were married couples living together, 16.6% had a female householder with no husband present, and 32.0% were non-families. 29.0% of all households were made up of individuals, and 13.6% had someone living alone who was 65 years of age or older. The average household size was 2.78 and the average family size was 3.49.

In the town, the population was spread out, with 29.9% under the age of 18, 10.0% from 18 to 24, 28.6% from 25 to 44, 21.3% from 45 to 64, and 10.2% who were 65 years of age or older. The median age was 34 years. For every 100 females, there were 108.4 males. For every 100 females age 18 and over, there were 101.8 males.

The median income for a household in the town was $22,604, and the median income for a family was $28,036. Males had a median income of $22,250 versus $20,500 for females. The per capita income for the town was $10,184. About 31.5% of families and 34.8% of the population were below the poverty line, including 44.8% of those under age 18 and 19.5% of those age 65 or over.

Education
Hammon Public Schools
Hammon Public School is a member of the Western Technology Center District. WTC provides the opportunity for adults and high school students to get occupationally-specific training. As a member of the WTC district, high school juniors and seniors living in the Hammon School District have the opportunity to attend classes at the WTC campus in Burns Flat. High school students who are residents of the WTC District can enroll in WTC full-time training on a tuition-free basis. Adult students are allowed to attend classes on a tuition basis. Tuition for adult students is $2.00 per training hour. Adult students can apply for financial assistance  to attend WTC.

Historic Locations

Three NRHP listings are in or around Hammon:
Dorroh-Trent House
Allee Site, a Plains Village period (A.D. 1000 to 1500) archeological location.
Lamb-Miller Site, also a Plains Village archeological location.

Notable people
Joe Stanka, Major League Baseball pitcher, was born in Hammon.
Bess Stinson, Arizona state legislator and businesswoman, was born in Hammon, in Roger Mills County.

Ryan and Damon Minor played baseball for Hammon High School and both went to the MLB

References

External links
 Encyclopedia of Oklahoma History and Culture - Hammon
 Hammon Public Schools Home Page

Towns in Custer County, Oklahoma
Towns in Roger Mills County, Oklahoma
Towns in Oklahoma